Julian Joseph "Lizzie" Lezard (14 February 1902 – 31 August 1958) was a South African tennis player.

Lezard, the eldest son of a solicitor, came from Kimberley, South Africa and was educated at Cambridge University. 

Active in tennis during the 1920s, Lezard featured in seven editions of the Wimbledon Championships. In 1926 he represented the South Africa Davis Cup team in ties against Portugal and Sweden.

Lezard, married in 1929, was the fourth husband of Hilda Cooper. They divorced in 1945. Her son from a previous marriage was Dan Ranfurly (6th Earl of Ranfurly), who was Governor of the Bahamas in the 1950s.

In World War II, Lezard worked for British Intelligence under the codename Église. He took part in a two-man Special Operations Executive mission (with Xan Fielding) near Seyne, France in 1944. After being parachuted down over the Basses Alpes, he had a bad landing and suffered two fractured vertebrae.

Lezard was the great uncle of journalist Nicholas Lezard.

See also
List of South Africa Davis Cup team representatives

References

External links
 
 
 

1902 births
1958 deaths
South African male tennis players
Sportspeople from Kimberley, Northern Cape
Alumni of the University of Cambridge
British Special Operations Executive personnel